HMS M15  was a First World War Royal Navy  monitor.

Design
In addition to her 9.2-inch gun, she also possessed one 12-pounder and one six pound anti-aircraft gun. She was equipped with Triple Expansion steam engines rated to 800 horse power that allowed a top speed of eleven knots. The monitor's crew consisted of sixty nine officers and men.

Construction
HMS M15 was ordered in March, 1915, as part of the War Emergency Programme of ship construction. She was laid down at the William Gray shipyard at Hartlepool in March 1915, launched on 28 April 1915, and completed in June 1915.

First World War
M15 was towed to Malta in July, 1915, where she received her main armament. She then proceeded to Mudros, and later was involved in the defence of the Suez Canal.

Hamas Recovery of Ammunition
In 2020, Hamas divers recovered ammunition, including large-caliber naval shells, from the wreck of the M15 with the intent of using explosives from the shells to make warheads and gunpowder propellant to make rocket fuel. After more than a century at the bottom of the sea, however, the material was found to be unusable.

Citations

References
 
 Dittmar, F. J. & Colledge, J. J., "British Warships 1914-1919", (Ian Allan, London, 1972), 

 

M15-class monitors
1915 ships
World War I monitors of the United Kingdom
Royal Navy ship names
Ships sunk by German submarines in World War I
Maritime incidents in 1917
World War I shipwrecks in the Mediterranean Sea